The Turkish Informatics Olympiad is an annual programming contest organized by the Scientific and Technological Research Council of Turkey (TUBITAK) since 1993. The contest consists of two main parts, and as a result of these two, national medals are given to winners. Four of the medal winners, after a training camp and some tests, establish the Turkish National Team for participation in IOI.

The First Round

The Summer Camp
About twenty five of the successful students, who have not been invited before, are invited to summer camp. In this two-week-long camp, the participants are taught C language as well as fundamental algorithmic knowledge. The attitude and progress of the students are recorded for future decisions about the selection of the national team.

The Second Round
The second round exam is five-hour-long and contain three problems similar to those of International Olympiad in Informatics(IOI) The exam takes place in Middle East Technical University of Ankara. The successful students are rewarded. Two gold, four silvers and six bronze medals are given to the winners.

The Winter Camp
The medalists as well as some other successful participants are invited to the winter camp. In this camp, students are taught in the branches of combinatorics, computer game theory, advanced algorithms and data structures. The progress of the students as well as completion of the given homework and problems are watched carefully. Progress in the camp, success in the test at the end of the camp as well as success in two-day-long team selection test are the criteria for the national team.

External links
TURKBOT, Soner Yılmaz) 
Resmi WebSitesi, Ulusal Bilgisayar Olimpiyatları 
Looking For Programmers

Programming contests
Competitions in Turkey
Annual events in Turkey
1993 establishments in Turkey
Recurring events established in 1993
Scientific and Technological Research Council of Turkey